
Gmina Węgierska Górka is a rural gmina (administrative district) in Żywiec County, Silesian Voivodeship, in southern Poland.

Villages
Gmina Węgierska Górka contains the villages and settlements of Cięcina, Cisiec, Węgierska Górka and Żabnica.

Neighbouring gminas
Gmina Węgierska Górka is bordered by the gminas of Jeleśnia, Milówka, Radziechowy-Wieprz and Ujsoły.

Twin towns – sister cities

Gmina Węgierska Górka is twinned with:
 Lengyeltóti, Hungary
 Pákozd, Hungary

See also
 Battle of Węgierska Górka

References

Wegierska Gorka
Żywiec County